Yashvantrao Sakharam Desale was a freedom fighter and member of the Maharashtra Legislative Assembly for Sakri Taluka. He received an award from Indira Gandhi for his work against the British government. He was the chief promoter of Panjhra Kan Co-operative Sugar mill of Sakri.

References

Members of the Maharashtra Legislative Assembly
People from Dhule district
People from Dhule
People from Maharashtra
Marathi politicians
Indian National Congress politicians
Year of birth missing
Year of death missing